The city of Ottawa, Canada held municipal elections on January 5, 1920 to elect members of the 1920 Ottawa City Council.

Mayor of Ottawa

Plebiscites

Ottawa Board of Control
John Cameron becomes the first "Labour" candidate ever to be elected to Ottawa's board of control. His "running mate", William Lodge was not as successful.

(4 elected)

Ottawa City Council
(2 elected from each ward)

By-election
There was a by-election held on March 22, 1920 to fill a vacancy created by the resignation of James D. Denny in Wellington Ward. Results:

References

External links
The Ottawa Evening Citizen, Jan 6, 1920
Ottawa City Council Minutes: 1920

Municipal elections in Ottawa
1920 elections in Canada
1920 in Ontario
1920s in Ottawa